Wellington tramway may refer to:
 Wellington tramway system, operated from 1878 to 1964 in New Zealand's capital city
 Wellington Tramway Museum, established in 1965 after the closure of the Wellington tramway system

See also
 Trams in New Zealand